Xiangyang is a town of Jidong County, Heilongjiang, China. , it has one residential community and 9 villages under its administration.

References

Township-level divisions of Heilongjiang
Jidong County